Forty-four candidates were registered for the 2009 Afghan presidential election when the Independent Election Commission of Afghanistan (IEC) announced its official preliminary list of candidates on May 17, 2009. Three candidates withdrew from the race before the election took place, having thrown their support behind one of the top two contenders. Forty-one names appeared on the ballot paper for the vote, although a few more had by then announced through the media that they had dropped out.

List of presidential candidates

The candidates participating in the Afghan presidential election on August 20, 2009, were:

See also
Afghan Transitional Administration
Civilian casualties of the War in Afghanistan (2001–present)
Demography of Afghanistan
International public opinion on the war in Afghanistan
List of Afghan Transitional Administration personnel
War in Afghanistan (1978–present)
War in Afghanistan (2001–present)
Northern Alliance

References

External links
List of candidates in the Afghan presidential election (photos)
Islamic Republic of Afghanistan - Electoral Complaints Commission (ECC) website
IEC (Independent Election Commission of Afghanistan) website
FEFA (Free & Fair Election Foundation of Afghanistan)  website
United Nations Development Programme - UNDP/ELECT website
Afghan Elections Dossier, August 2009, Radio France Internationale coverage
Afghanistan's Elections coverage from The Washington Post

Lists of Afghan politicians
Presidential elections in Afghanistan
2009